Gagino is the name of several rural localities in Russia:
Gagino, Lipetsk Oblast, a selo in Topovsky Selsoviet of Lev-Tolstovsky District of Lipetsk Oblast
Gagino, Moscow Oblast, a village in Bereznyakovskoye Rural Settlement of Sergiyevo-Posadsky District of Moscow Oblast
Gagino, Nizhny Novgorod Oblast, a selo in Gaginsky Selsoviet of Gaginsky District of Nizhny Novgorod Oblast
Gagino, Ryazan Oblast, a village in Tyrnovsky Rural Okrug of Pronsky District of Ryazan Oblast